Sphenomorphus fragilis  is a species of skink found in Papua New Guinea.

References

fragilis
Reptiles described in 1877
Taxa named by William John Macleay
Skinks of New Guinea